Satyabati may refer to:
 Satyabati (Mahabharata), a character in the Hindu epic Mahabharata
 Satyabati (Byomkesh), a fictional character in the Byomkesh detective series  by Sharadindu Bandyopadhyay
 Satyavati Devi (1904–1945), participant in Indian independence movement. She was acclaimed as the Joan of Arc of India
 Satyavati, the queen of the Kuru king Shantanu of Hastinapur